The State of Scott was a Southern Unionist movement in Scott County, Tennessee, in which the county declared itself a "Free and Independent State" following Tennessee's decision to secede from the United States and align the state with the Confederacy on the eve of the American Civil War in 1861. Like much of East Tennessee, Scott became an enclave community of the Union during the war. Although its edict had never been officially recognized, the county did not officially rescind its act of secession until 1986.

Background
At the time of the secession from the Union, Tennessee's Scott County listed only 61 slaves in residence. It was one of only two counties in the entire state with fewer than 100 slaves. Tennessee was the last state to secede from the Union, in part due to the huge divide in resources and political power between the state's three divisions. East Tennessee, of which Scott County was a part, was less dependent on slavery than Middle and West Tennessee. Therefore, there was little incentive for the residents of the eastern part of the state to go to war to preserve that socio-economic institution. The people of East Tennessee largely favored an intact Union and wanted minimal government interference in their lives. They held a generally unfavorable view of the rest of the state whose wealthy business men and plantation owners wielded political and economic power over the entire state.

History
In a June 8, 1861 speech delivered on the steps of the Huntsville courthouse by Senator (and future president) Andrew Johnson—a Democrat and himself a slave holder—he stated, "...it is not the free men of the north that [secessionists] are fearing most, but the free men of the South..." Four days later, the people of Scott county voted overwhelmingly (541–19) against Tennessee's referendum on secession from the Union, and later that year the county court voted to approve the Scott County General Assembly's unanimous resolution approving of its own secession from Tennessee. The resolution allowed the immediate formation of the "Independent State of Scott," which established an enclave community whose sympathies remained strongly loyal to the Union throughout, and following, the war.

Governor's response
In response to the State of Scott proclamation of independence, Tennessee Governor Isham Harris quickly gathered 1700 soldiers to march to Huntsville and put down the "rebellion." Facing extreme resistance, however, the troops were forced to retreat before reaching the capital.

Violence
Because the area was of little strategic value, the mountainous and somewhat isolated State of Scott was not the site of any fighting on a major scale during the Civil War, with the exception of the minor Battle of Huntsville, fought on August 13, 1862. Facing a force of approximately 2,000 troops and suffering from high levels of desertion and battle attrition, Union commander Colonel William Clift was forced from the town and retreated into the back woods with about 20 remaining men. After the Battle of Huntsville, Clift's reconstituted but ragtag regiment fought more as a guerrilla unit for much of the rest of the year. The area continued to be torn for some time by guerrilla warfare, bushwhacking, and skirmishing, which often took on a brutally violent and vicious nature, often between neighbors. Male residents from the area did, however, become the main source of volunteers for the Union’s 7th Regiment Tennessee Volunteer Infantry.

Aftermath
Ulysses S. Grant received over 90% of the vote in Scott County during both the 1868 United States presidential election and the 1872 United States presidential election. The county has voted Republican in virtually every presidential election since, excepting the 1912 election where it voted for the Progressive Party.

The proclamation of secession was finally repealed by Scott County in 1986. At the same time, the county petitioned the state of Tennessee for readmission, which was ceremonially granted, even though its secession had not been recognized by the state—nor the federal governments of either the Union or the Confederacy.

Roadside marker
Today, a roadside marker on SR 63, near the county seat, Huntsville, Tennessee, reads:

See also
 State of Franklin, a similar area in East Tennessee
 Republic of Winston, a similar area in Alabama
 Nickajack, a similar region in North Alabama and East Tennessee

References

Further reading
 Crofts, Daniel W; "Reluctant Confederates: Upper South Unionists in the Secession Crisis."
 Fischer, Noel C; "War at Every Door: Partisan Politics and Guerrilla Violence in East Tennessee, 1860–1869."
 Groce, W. Todd; "Mountain Rebels: East Tennessee Confederates and the Civil War, 1860–1870"
 Temple, Oliver Temple; "East Tennessee and the Civil War."
 Gason, J.H.; "Mist in the Mountains. A Chronicle of Scott County"

Former regions and territories of the United States
Former territorial entities in North America
Tennessee in the American Civil War
Southern Unionists in the American Civil War
Scott County, Tennessee
Micronations in the United States
1861 establishments in Tennessee
1986 disestablishments in Tennessee
Andrew Johnson